All Is Not Lost is the first full-length album by Architect. It was released on January 23, 2007.

Track listing
"The Awakening"
"Sic Semper Tyrannis"
"11"
"Trepanning for Oil"
"13"
"Hell of the Upsidedown Sinners"
"The End of It"
"Collapse the War Engine"
"33"
"Broke Dick Dog"
"The Giving Tree"

Reception 

The album was described by Decibel as a "startlingly accomplished debut", while Stylus commented that the band's "rhythms resemble the speech patterns of a screaming match".

References 

2007 debut albums
Architect (band) albums
Black Market Activities albums